The R932 road is a regional road in Ireland which links the N74 road with the R505 regional road in Cashel in County Tipperary.

See also 

 Roads in Ireland
 National primary road
 National secondary road

References 

Regional roads in the Republic of Ireland

Roads in County Tipperary